Nike Nike is the designation of a United States sounding rocket. The Nike Nike consists of two Nike rocket booster stages (and if necessary a further rocket stage) and reaches a ceiling of 352 km. The Nike Nike was used 16 times between 1954 and 1979.

References

Nike (rocket family)